The 1993 Humo European Open was a professional ranking snooker tournament that took place in February 1993 at the Matchroom Schijnpoort in Antwerp, Belgium. Only the latter stages, from the last-16, were played in Antwerp.

Steve Davis won the tournament, defeating Stephen Hendry 10–4 in the final.


Main draw

References

European Masters (snooker)
European Open
European Open
European Open
Snooker in Belgium
Sports competitions in Antwerp